William Daniel Quarles Jr. (born January 16, 1948) is a former United States district judge of the United States District Court for the District of Maryland.

Background
Born in Baltimore, Maryland in 1948, Quarles attended Baltimore City Public Schools and graduated from the Baltimore City College highschool in 1966.  He earned an Associate of Arts degree from Community College of Baltimore in 1967, a Bachelor of Science degree from the University of Maryland, College Park in 1976, and a Juris Doctor from the Columbus School of Law at the Catholic University of America in 1979.

Legal career
From 1979 to 1982, Quarles was a law clerk to Judge Joseph C. Howard of the U.S. District Court for the District of Maryland. After working in private practice from 1981 to 1982, he joined the U.S. Attorney's Office in Baltimore, where he served as an Assistant United States Attorney until 1986.  He reentered private practice at Venable LLP in 1986 and remained with the firm until he became an Associate Circuit Judge for the Circuit Court for Baltimore City in 1996.

Federal judicial service
On January 7, 2003, Quarles was named to the federal bench by President George W. Bush, to a seat vacated by William M. Nickerson. Quarles was confirmed by the United States Senate on March 12, 2003, and received his commission on March 14, 2003. He retired from active service on February 1, 2016.

He is the author of Summary Adjudication: Dispositive Motions and Summary Trials (1991).

See also 
 List of African-American federal judges
 List of African-American jurists

References

Sources

1948 births
Living people
African-American judges
Assistant United States Attorneys
Baltimore City College alumni
Columbus School of Law alumni
Judges of the United States District Court for the District of Maryland
People from Baltimore
United States district court judges appointed by George W. Bush
21st-century American judges
University of Maryland, College Park alumni